Darvand-e Seh (also Romanized as Dārvand-e Seh) is a village in Direh Rural District, in the Central District of Gilan-e Gharb County, Kermanshah Province, Iran. At the 2006 census, its population was 104, in 23 families.

References 

Populated places in Gilan-e Gharb County